Barren Creek is a stream in Polk County in the U.S. state of Missouri. It is a tributary of Bear Creek.

The stream flows southwest crossing under Missouri Route 32 and Missouri Route 123 to the east and south of Fair Play.

Barren Creek was named after Kentucky's Barren River.

See also
List of rivers of Missouri

References

Rivers of Polk County, Missouri
Rivers of Missouri